Danny C. Williams Sr. is an American attorney who served as the United States Attorney for the Northern District of Oklahoma from 2012 to 2017.

See also
2017 dismissal of U.S. attorneys

References

Living people
Year of birth missing (living people)
United States Attorneys for the Northern District of Oklahoma
Oklahoma Democrats
Oklahoma lawyers
Dillard University alumni
University of Tulsa College of Law alumni
20th-century American lawyers
21st-century American lawyers